Pat Upton (August 5, 1940 – July 27, 2016) was an American singer, songwriter and guitarist with the band Spiral Starecase. He was the songwriter of, and lead vocalist on, their 1969 gold-selling single "More Today Than Yesterday", which peaked at #12 on the Billboard Hot 100. The song has been covered by Sonny & Cher, Diana Ross, Andy Williams, Lena Horne, Patti Austin, and Goldfinger.

After Spiral Starecase disbanded in 1971, Upton relocated to Los Angeles, where he worked as a session musician and then a band member for Ricky Nelson. Upton was noted as having an exceptionally high voice for a man. On December 30, 1985, after a performance at Upton's Guntersville, Alabama club PJ's Alley, Nelson asked Upton to accompany him on a flight to Dallas, Texas, but Upton declined due to business obligations. The flight crashed, killing Nelson, Nelson's fiancée Helen, and five members of Nelson's band.

Upton lived with his wife, former model Lynn Upton, in Guntersville, and they had three daughters and a son, while he was a grandfather of six. He died in his hometown of Geraldine, Alabama on July 27, 2016, at age 75.

Discography

Solo
Then and Now - 1995

With Rick Nelson
Playing to Win - backing vocals - 1981

With Juice Newton
Well Kept Secret - backing vocals - 1978
Take Heart - backing vocals - 1979

References

External links 
 
 Youtube Video of Pat Upton with Spiral Starecase

1940 births
2016 deaths
Guitarists from Alabama
American male singer-songwriters
American male guitarists
20th-century American guitarists
20th-century American male musicians
Singer-songwriters from Alabama
American tenors